"Night's on Fire" is a song recorded by American country music artist David Nail.  It was released to radio on July 20, 2015 as the lead single to his fourth studio album Fighter.  The song was written by Jonathan Singleton and Deric Ruttan.

Critical reception
An uncredited Taste of Country review stated that the song "borrows from Arcade Fire for a pop-rock-infused story about two lovers enjoying the moonlight like country kids do. It hits you across the face from the very first note. Sonically, it’s a very thick track.
Italian magazine "Vanity Fair.it" praised the song in its review, saying that "Night's on Fire's country atmospheres will carry the listener in the USA in the blink of an eye". The magazine also rated the song number 11 on its list of the 24 Greatest Italian Summer Hits.

Personnel
Chris McHugh - drums, percussion
Jerry McPherson - electric guitar
David Nail - lead vocals
Jonathan Singleton - acoustic guitar, background vocals
Ilya Toshinsky - banjo, acoustic guitar
Glenn Worf - bass guitar

Commercial performance
The song debuted on the Hot Country Songs chart at No. 43 on its release, and No. 40 on the Country Digital Songs chart with 6,200 copies sold.  It debuted on the Country Airplay chart at No. 53 the following week.  The song peaked at No. 14 on Country Airplay on chart dated July 23, 2016,  and No. 17 on Hot Country Songs a week later. The song has sold 198,000 copies in the US as of August 2016.
The song also charted on Billboard's 2016 Year-End Country Airplay Songs chart at No. 52.

Music video
The music video was directed by Justin Key and premiered in November 2015. It consists of footage from Nail's 2016 tour.

Chart performance

Weekly charts

Year end charts

Certifications

References

2015 songs
2015 singles
Songs written by Jonathan Singleton
Songs written by Deric Ruttan
David Nail songs
MCA Nashville Records singles
Song recordings produced by Frank Liddell
Song recordings produced by Chuck Ainlay